Otepää (formerly Nuustaku) is a town in Valga County, southern Estonia, it is the administrative centre of Otepää Parish. Otepää is a popular skiing resort, popularly known as the "winter capital" of Estonia (in contrast to the "summer capital" Pärnu). During the 2005–2006 season it became the site for FIS Cross-Country World Cup events.

The name "Otepää" means "Ott's Head" in South Estonian, where ott is a euphemism for "bear".

History
The first settlement in Otepää was in 6th century BC. It has been inhabited continuously since the 6th-7th centuries. Otepää was historically important as the site of a viking hill fort and medieval castle.

The fortress was first mentioned in Russian sources in 1116 when the princes of Novgorod and Pskov undertook a expedition against Tartu and Otepää.

The conquest of Estonia during the Northern Crusades began with an attack on the fortress at Otepää in 1208. The fort was attacked again in 1217, when Christianized southern Estonians stopped the Kievan Rus' advances.

The fort at Otepää was finally conquered in 1224 by German crusaders. Hermann of Dorpat, the first Prince-Bishop of the Bishopric of Dorpat (1224–1248) within the Livonian Confederation, built an episcopal castle at Otepää, which was the first stone fortress built in Estonia.

During the 14th century the importance of Otepää waned as Tartu, which was the seat of the Bishopric, grew in importance. The castle at Otepää was destroyed, but there is no written evidence of when the castle was abandoned. Archaeologist have argued that the castle was inhabited as late as 1477. But it is more commonly believed that the castle was razed by the Livonian Order in 1396 during a conflict with the Bishopric of Dorpat.

The earliest surviving firearm in Europe has been found in the castle of Otepää and it dates to at least 1396.

In 1862, the settlement was named Nuustaku and granted town privileges. In 1876, Tartu Estonian Farmers' Society and Estonian Farmer's Society held the first agricultural fair at Nuustaku church manor. On June 4, 1884 the flag that was to become the national flag of Estonia was dedicated in the Nuustaku Church as the flag of the Estonian Students' Society. The name Nuustaku was changed to Otepää in 1922. Otepää became a town in 1936.

Geography

Otepää is situated in a landscape known as the Otepää Upland. The area is hilly and contains numerous lakes, including Lake Pühajärv.

Demographics

Government and Politics
Otepää's municipal status was briefly restored in 1989 when the local government re-emerged in Estonia. In 1999, Otepää City was merged with the Pühajärve rural municipality, which became known as the Otepää Rural Municipality. Otepää Parish is the local government administrative unit that governs Otepää City.

Gallery

See also
Tartu Maraton
Tehvandi Sports Center

References

External links

Cities and towns in Estonia
Ski areas and resorts in Estonia
Castles of the Teutonic Knights
Former municipalities of Estonia
Kreis Dorpat